The 1989 Major League Baseball All-Star Game was the 60th playing of the midsummer classic between the all-stars of the American League (AL) and National League (NL), the two leagues comprising Major League Baseball. The game was held on July 11, 1989, at Anaheim Stadium in Anaheim, California, the home of the California Angels of the American League. The game is noted for being the first in All-Star Game history to include the designated hitter.  The game resulted in the American League defeating the National League 5-3. The game is remembered for Bo Jackson's monstrous lead-off home run to center field.  Jackson was named the game's MVP. The game also featured former U.S. President and former baseball announcer Ronald Reagan sharing the NBC broadcast booth with Vin Scully for the first inning.

The pregame ceremonies featured Disney characters joining this year's players in sprinting onto the field for the introduction of the starting lineups.  Mike Schmidt of the Philadelphia Phillies, who had retired on May 29, was still elected by the fans as the starting third baseman for the NL All-Star team.  Schmidt decided not to play, but he did participate in the game's opening ceremony in uniform.  Doc Severinsen later led The Tonight Show Band in the playing of the Canadian and U.S. national anthems.  Severinsen and The Tonight Show Band's performance of the U.S. National Anthem was the last non-vocal performance of the Anthem at the All-Star Game to date.  The ceremonial first pitch was thrown by longtime Angels coach Jimmie Reese.

This was the second All-Star Game to be played in Anaheim, which last hosted the Midsummer Classic in 1967.  It would return to the by-now renovated and renamed Angel Stadium of Anaheim in 2010.

Rosters
Players in italics have since been inducted into the National Baseball Hall of Fame.

National League

American League

Game

Coaching staff

Umpires

Starting lineups

Game summary

The NL got off to a fast start off Dave Stewart in the first on RBI singles by Kevin Mitchell and Howard Johnson.  The AL would counter in spectacular fashion in their half when game MVP Bo Jackson golfed the second pitch by Rick Reuschel, a low sinker, out in deep center.  Wade Boggs followed with a homer to tie it.

The AL took the lead the very next inning when Jackson beat out a double play grounder, scoring Rubén Sierra.  Jackson then stole second, making him the only player (to date) to have a home run and a stolen base in the same All-Star game.  The AL expanded their lead to 5-2 in the third on RBI singles by Harold Baines and Sierra.  The NL would get no closer than a run in the eighth when Von Hayes singled home Glenn Davis.

Footnotes and references

External links
Baseball-Reference.com
Lineups, boxscore, and more

Major League Baseball All-Star Game
Major League Baseball All-Star Game
Baseball competitions in Anaheim, California
20th century in Anaheim, California
Major League Baseball All Star Game
July 1989 sports events in the United States